Pausa is a town in Central Peru, capital of the province Paucar del Sara Sara in the region Ayacucho.

References

External links
Satellite map at Maplandia

Populated places in the Ayacucho Region